Epinephelini is one of the five tribes in the subfamily Epinephelinae, the groupers, which is part of the family Serranidae which also includes the anthias and the sea basses.

Genera
The following genera are placed within the tribe:

 Aethaloperca Fowler, 1904 (redmouth grouper)
 Alphestes Bloch & Schneider, 1801
 Anyperodon Günther, 1859
 Cephalopholis Bloch & Schneider, 1801
 Chromileptes Swainson, 1839
 Dermatolepis Gill, 1861
 Epinephelus Bloch, 1793
 Gonioplectrus Gill, 1862
 Gracila Randall, 1964
 Hyporthodus Gill, 1861
 Mycteroperca Gill, 1862
 Paranthias Guichenot, 1868
 Plectropomus Pken, 1817
 Saloptia J.L.B. Smith, 1964
 Triso Randall, Johnson & Lowe, 1989
 Variola Swainson, 1839

References

 
Epinephelinae
Fish tribes